In mathematics, differential forms provide a unified approach to define integrands over curves, surfaces, solids, and higher-dimensional manifolds.  The modern notion of differential forms was pioneered by Élie Cartan.  It has many applications, especially in geometry, topology and physics.

For instance, the expression  is an example of a -form, and can be integrated over an interval  contained in the domain of :

Similarly, the expression  is a -form that can be integrated over a surface :

The symbol  denotes the exterior product, sometimes called the wedge product, of two differential forms. Likewise, a -form  represents a volume element that can be integrated over a region of space. In general, a -form is an object that may be integrated over a -dimensional manifold, and is homogeneous of degree  in the coordinate differentials 
On an -dimensional manifold, the top-dimensional form (-form) is called a volume form.

The differential forms form an alternating algebra. This implies that  and  This alternating property reflects the orientation of the domain of integration.  

The exterior derivative is an operation on differential forms  that, given a -form , produces a -form  This operation extends the differential of a function (a function can be considered as a -form, and its differential is ) This allows expressing the fundamental theorem of calculus, the divergence theorem, Green's theorem, and Stokes' theorem as special cases of a single general result, the generalized Stokes theorem.

Differential -forms are naturally dual to vector fields on a differentiable manifold, and the pairing between vector fields and -forms is extended to arbitrary differential forms by the interior product.  The algebra of differential forms along with the exterior derivative defined on it is preserved by the pullback under smooth functions between two manifolds.  This feature allows geometrically invariant information to be moved from one space to another via the pullback, provided that the information is expressed in terms of differential forms.  As an example, the change of variables formula for integration becomes a simple statement that an integral is preserved under pullback.

History
Differential forms are part of the field of differential geometry, influenced by linear algebra.  Although the notion of a differential is quite old, the initial attempt at an algebraic organization of differential forms is usually credited to Élie Cartan with reference to his 1899 paper. Some aspects of the exterior algebra of differential forms appears in Hermann Grassmann's 1844 work, Die Lineale Ausdehnungslehre, ein neuer Zweig der Mathematik (The Theory of Linear Extension, a New Branch of Mathematics).

Concept

Differential forms provide an approach to multivariable calculus that is independent of coordinates.

Integration and orientation
A differential -form can be integrated over an oriented manifold of dimension .  A differential -form can be thought of as measuring an infinitesimal oriented length, or 1-dimensional oriented density.  A differential -form can be thought of as measuring an infinitesimal oriented area, or 2-dimensional oriented density.  And so on.

Integration of differential forms is well-defined only on oriented manifolds.  An example of a 1-dimensional manifold is an interval , and intervals can be given an orientation: they are positively oriented if , and negatively oriented otherwise.  If  then the integral of the differential -form  over the interval  (with its natural positive orientation) is

which is the negative of the integral of the same differential form over the same interval, when equipped with the opposite orientation.  That is:

This gives a geometrical context to the conventions for one-dimensional integrals, that the sign changes when the orientation of the interval is reversed.  A standard explanation of this in one-variable integration theory is that, when the limits of integration are in the opposite order, the increment  is negative in the direction of integration.

More generally, an -form is an oriented density that can be integrated over an -dimensional oriented manifold. (For example, a -form can be integrated over an oriented curve, a -form can be integrated over an oriented surface, etc.)

These conventions correspond to interpreting the integrand as a differential form, integrated over a chain. In measure theory, by contrast, one interprets the integrand as a function  with respect to a measure  and integrates over a subset , without any notion of orientation; one writes  to indicate integration over a subset . This is a minor distinction in one dimension, but becomes subtler on higher-dimensional manifolds; see below for details.

Making the notion of an oriented density precise, and thus of a differential form, involves the exterior algebra.  The differentials of a set of coordinates, ...,  can be used as a basis for all -forms.  Each of these represents a covector at each point on the manifold that may be thought of as measuring a small displacement in the corresponding coordinate direction.  A general -form is a linear combination of these differentials at every point on the manifold:

A differential -form is integrated along an oriented curve as a line integral.

The expressions , where  can be used as a basis at every point on the manifold for all -forms.  This may be thought of as an infinitesimal oriented square parallel to the –-plane.  A general -form is a linear combination of these at every point on the manifold:  and it is integrated just like a surface integral.

A fundamental operation defined on differential forms is the exterior product (the symbol is the wedge ).  This is similar to the cross product from vector calculus, in that it is an alternating product. For instance,

The exterior product allows higher-degree differential forms to be built out of lower-degree ones, in much the same way that the cross product in vector calculus allows one to compute the area vector of a parallelogram from vectors pointing up the two sides. Alternating also implies that , in the same way that the cross product of parallel vectors, whose magnitude is the area of the parallelogram spanned by those vectors, is zero. In higher dimensions,  if any two of the indices , ...,  are equal, in the same way that the "volume" enclosed by a parallelotope whose edge vectors are linearly dependent is zero.

Multi-index notation 
By calculating the size of  combinatorially, the module of -forms on an -dimensional manifold, and in general space of -covectors on an -dimensional vector space, is  choose :  This also demonstrates that there are no nonzero differential forms of degree greater than the dimension of the underlying manifold.

The exterior derivative 
In addition to the exterior product, there is also the exterior derivative operator . When generalized to higher forms, if  is a simple -form, then its exterior derivative  is a -form defined by taking the differential of the coefficient functions:

with extension to general -forms through linearity: if  then its exterior derivative is

 

In , with the Hodge star operator, the exterior derivative corresponds to gradient, curl, and divergence, although this correspondence, like the cross product, does not generalize to higher dimensions, and should be treated with some caution. 

The exterior derivative itself applies in an arbitrary finite number of dimensions, and is a flexible and powerful tool with wide application in differential geometry, differential topology, and many areas in physics. Of note, although the above definition of the exterior derivative was defined with respect to local coordinates, it can be defined in an entirely coordinate-free manner, as an antiderivation of degree 1 on the exterior algebra of differential forms. The benefit of this more general approach is that it allows for a natural coordinate-free approach to integrate on manifolds. It also allows for a natural generalization of the fundamental theorem of calculus, called the (generalized) Stokes' theorem, which is a central result in the theory of integration on manifolds.

Differential calculus
A differential -form ("zero-form") is defined to be a smooth function  on  – the set of which is denoted .

The first idea leading to differential forms is the observation that  is a linear function of :

for any vectors ,  and any real number . Thus . Note that at each , the differential  is not a real number, but a linear functional on tangent vectors, and a prototypical example of a differential -form.

Let . Since , the Kronecker delta function, it follows that

The meaning of this expression is given by evaluating both sides at an arbitrary point : on the right hand side, the sum is defined "pointwise", so that

for each . Any differential -form arises this way, and by using  it follows that any differential -form  on  may be expressed in coordinates as

The above expansion reduces this question to the search for a function  whose partial derivatives  are equal to  given functions . For , such a function does not always exist: any smooth function  satisfies

so it will be impossible to find such an  unless

where  is defined so that:

 

This is an example of a differential -form. It is given by

Differential -forms, -forms, and -forms are special cases of differential forms. For each , there is a space of differential -forms, which can be expressed in terms of the coordinates as

for a collection of functions .

Differential forms, the exterior product and the exterior derivative are independent of a choice of coordinates. Consequently, they may be defined on any smooth manifold . However, there are more intrinsic definitions which make the independence of coordinates manifest.

Intrinsic definitions

Let  be a smooth manifold. The set of all differential -forms on a manifold  is a vector space, often denoted .

The definition of a differential form may be restated as follows.  At any point , a -form  defines an element

That is,  is also a linear functional , i.e. the dual of the th exterior power is isomorphic to the th exterior power of the dual:

 

By the universal property of exterior powers, this is equivalently an alternating multilinear map:

Differential -forms are sometimes called covariant vector fields, covector fields, or "dual vector fields", particularly within physics.

The exterior algebra may be embedded in the tensor algebra by means of the alternation map. The alternation map is defined as a mapping  
 
For a tensor  at a point ,

where  is the symmetric group on  elements.  The alternation map is constant on the cosets of the ideal in the tensor algebra generated by the symmetric 2-forms, and therefore descends to an embedding
 

This map exhibits  as a totally antisymmetric covariant tensor field of rank .

Operations

As well as the addition and multiplication by scalar operations which arise from the vector space structure, there are several other standard operations defined on differential forms. The most important operations are the exterior product of two differential forms, the exterior derivative of a single differential form, the interior product of a differential form and a vector field, the Lie derivative of a differential form with respect to a vector field and the covariant derivative of a differential form with respect to a vector field on a manifold with a defined connection.

Exterior product 
The exterior product of a -form  and an -form , denoted , is a -form. When the exterior algebra is viewed as a quotient of the tensor algebra, the exterior product corresponds to the tensor product (modulo the equivalence relation defining the exterior algebra).

The antisymmetry inherent in the exterior algebra means that when  is viewed as a multilinear functional, it is alternating. However, when the exterior algebra is embedded as a subspace of the tensor algebra by means of the alternation map, the tensor product  is not alternating. There is an explicit formula which describes the exterior product in this situation.  The exterior product is

This description is useful for explicit computations. For example, if , then  is the -form whose value at a point  is the alternating bilinear form defined by

One also has the graded Leibniz rule:

Riemannian manifold 
On a Riemannian manifold, or more generally a pseudo-Riemannian manifold, the metric defines a fibre-wise isomorphism of the tangent and cotangent bundles.  This makes it possible to convert vector fields to covector fields and vice versa.  It also enables the definition of additional operations such as the Hodge star operator  and the codifferential , which has degree  and is adjoint to the exterior differential .

Vector field structures 
On a pseudo-Riemannian manifold, -forms can be identified with vector fields; vector fields have additional distinct algebraic structures, which are listed here for context and to avoid confusion.

Firstly, each (co)tangent space generates a Clifford algebra, where the product of a (co)vector with itself is given by the value of a quadratic form – in this case, the natural one induced by the metric. This algebra is distinct from the exterior algebra of differential forms, which can be viewed as a Clifford algebra where the quadratic form vanishes (since the exterior product of any vector with itself is zero). Clifford algebras are thus non-anticommutative ("quantum") deformations of the exterior algebra. They are studied in geometric algebra.

Another alternative is to consider vector fields as derivations. The (noncommutative) algebra of differential operators they generate is the Weyl algebra and is a noncommutative ("quantum") deformation of the symmetric algebra in the vector fields.

Exterior differential complex
One important property of the exterior derivative is that . This means that the exterior derivative defines a cochain complex:

Pullback

Suppose that  is smooth. This map is also denoted  and called the pushforward. However, the same is not true of a vector field. If  is not surjective, then there will be a point  at which  does not determine any tangent vector at all.

By contrast, it is always possible to pull back a differential form. A differential form on  may be viewed as a linear functional on each tangent space. The existence of pullbacks is one of the key features of the theory of differential forms. It leads to the existence of pullback maps in other situations, such as pullback homomorphisms in de Rham cohomology.

There are several more abstract ways to view this definition. The pullback of  may be defined to be the composite

In full generality, let  denote the th exterior power of the dual map to the differential. Then the pullback of a -form  is the composite

Another abstract way to view the pullback comes from viewing a -form  as a linear functional on tangent spaces.  From this point of view,  is a morphism of vector bundles

The composite map

Pullback respects all of the basic operations on forms.

The pullback of a form can also be written in coordinates.

Using the linearity of pullback and its compatibility with exterior product, the pullback of  has the formula

The resulting -form can be written using Jacobian matrices:

Integration
A differential -form can be integrated over an oriented -dimensional manifold. If , integration over oriented 0-dimensional submanifolds is just the summation of the integrand evaluated at points, with according to the orientation of those points. Other values of  correspond to line integrals, surface integrals, volume integrals, and so on. There are several equivalent ways to formally define the integral of a differential form, all of which depend on reducing to the case of Euclidean space.

Integration on Euclidean space
Give  its standard orientation and  the restriction of that orientation. Every smooth -form  on  has the form

for some smooth function . Such a function has an integral in the usual Riemann or Lebesgue sense.

Fixing an orientation is necessary for this to be well-defined. Riemann and Lebesgue integrals cannot see this dependence on the ordering of the coordinates, so they leave the sign of the integral undetermined. The orientation resolves this ambiguity.

Integration over chains
That is, assume that there exists a diffeomorphism

where . In coordinates, this has the following expression. Then

Suppose that  is defined by

Then the integral may be written in coordinates as

where

is the determinant of the Jacobian.  The Jacobian exists because  is differentiable.

But such a parametrization is always possible locally, so it is possible to define integrals over arbitrary manifolds by defining them as sums of integrals over collections of local parametrizations. A -chain is a formal sum of smooth embeddings . That is, it is a collection of smooth embeddings, each of which is assigned an integer multiplicity. If the chain is

This approach to defining integration does not assign a direct meaning to integration over the whole manifold .  However, it is still possible to assign such a meaning indirectly because every smooth manifold may be smoothly triangulated in an essentially unique way, and the integral over  may be defined to be the integral over the chain determined by a triangulation.

Integration using partitions of unity
The integral of an -form  on an -dimensional manifold is defined by working in charts. Suppose first that  is supported on a single positively oriented chart. Here, the form has a well-defined Riemann or Lebesgue integral as before.

It is also possible to integrate -forms on oriented -dimensional submanifolds using this more intrinsic approach. The form is pulled back to the submanifold, where the integral is defined using charts as before.

Integration along fibers

Fubini's theorem states that the integral over a set that is a product may be computed as an iterated integral over the two factors in the product.  This suggests that the integral of a differential form over a product ought to be computable as an iterated integral as well.  The geometric flexibility of differential forms ensures that this is possible not just for products, but in more general situations as well.  Under some hypotheses, it is possible to integrate along the fibers of a smooth map, and the analog of Fubini's theorem is the case where this map is the projection from a product to one of its factors.

Because integrating a differential form over a submanifold requires fixing an orientation, a prerequisite to integration along fibers is the existence of a well-defined orientation on those fibers. Suppose that  is a surjective submersion. Fix  and set . Suppose that

and that  does not vanish.  Following , there is a unique

More precisely, define  to be the inclusion. Then  is defined by the property that

where

is any -covector for which

The form  may also be notated .

That is, suppose that

is a smooth section of the projection map; we say that  is a smooth differential -form on  along .  Then there is a smooth differential -form  on  such that, at each ,

This form is denoted . The same construction works if  is an -form in a neighborhood of the fiber, and the same notation is used. A consequence is that each fiber  is orientable.

The analog of Fubini's theorem is as follows. Moreover, there is an integrable -form on  defined by

Denote this form by

Then  proves the generalized Fubini formula

It is also possible to integrate forms of other degrees along the fibers of a submersion. More precisely, at each , there is an isomorphism

defined by the interior product

Each of these covectors has an exterior product against , so there is an -form  on  along  defined by

Then the -form  is uniquely defined by the property

Integration along fibers is important for the construction of Gysin maps in de Rham cohomology.

Integration along fibers satisfies the projection formula .

Stokes's theorem

This case is called the gradient theorem, and generalizes the fundamental theorem of calculus. This path independence is very useful in contour integration.

This theorem also underlies the duality between de Rham cohomology and the homology of chains.

Relation with measures 

On a general differentiable manifold (without additional structure), differential forms cannot be integrated over subsets of the manifold; this distinction is key to the distinction between differential forms, which are integrated over chains or oriented submanifolds, and measures, which are integrated over subsets. The simplest example is attempting to integrate the -form  over the interval . By contrast, the integral of the measure  on the interval is unambiguously  (i.e. the integral of the constant function  with respect to this measure is ). Similarly, under a change of coordinates a differential -form changes by the Jacobian determinant , while a measure changes by the absolute value of the Jacobian determinant, which further reflects the issue of orientation.

In the presence of the additional data of an orientation, it is possible to integrate -forms (top-dimensional forms) over the entire manifold or over compact subsets; integration over the entire manifold corresponds to integrating the form over the fundamental class of the manifold, . Formally, in the presence of an orientation, one may identify -forms with densities on a manifold; densities in turn define a measure, and thus can be integrated .

On an orientable but not oriented manifold, there are two choices of orientation; either choice allows one to integrate -forms over compact subsets, with the two choices differing by a sign. On non-orientable manifold, -forms and densities cannot be identified —notably, any top-dimensional form must vanish somewhere (there are no volume forms on non-orientable manifolds), but there are nowhere-vanishing densities— thus while one can integrate densities over compact subsets, one cannot integrate -forms. One can instead identify densities with top-dimensional pseudoforms.

Even in the presence of an orientation, there is in general no meaningful way to integrate -forms over subsets for  because there is no consistent way to use the ambient orientation to orient -dimensional subsets.  Geometrically, a -dimensional subset can be turned around in place, yielding the same subset with the opposite orientation; for example, the horizontal axis in a plane can be rotated by 180 degrees.  Compare the Gram determinant of a set of  vectors in an -dimensional space, which, unlike the determinant of  vectors, is always positive, corresponding to a squared number.  An orientation of a -submanifold is therefore extra data not derivable from the ambient manifold.

On a Riemannian manifold, one may define a -dimensional Hausdorff measure for any  (integer or real), which may be integrated over -dimensional subsets of the manifold. A function times this Hausdorff measure can then be integrated over -dimensional subsets, providing a measure-theoretic analog to integration of -forms. The -dimensional Hausdorff measure yields a density, as above.

Currents
The differential form analog of a distribution or generalized function is called a current. Currents play the role of generalized domains of integration, similar to but even more flexible than chains.

Applications in physics

Differential forms arise in some important physical contexts. For example, in Maxwell's theory of electromagnetism, the Faraday 2-form, or electromagnetic field strength, is

This form is a special case of the curvature form on the  principal bundle on which both electromagnetism and general gauge theories may be described. One then has

The current -form is

 

where  are the four components of the current density. However, the vector rsp. tensor components and the above-mentioned forms have different physical dimensions. Moreover, by decision of an international commission of the International Union of Pure and Applied Physics, the magnetic polarization vector has been called  for several decades, and by some publishers ; i.e., the same name is used for different quantities.)

Using the above-mentioned definitions, Maxwell's equations can be written very compactly in geometrized units as

where  denotes the Hodge star operator.  Similar considerations describe the geometry of gauge theories in general.

The -form , which is dual to the Faraday form, is also called Maxwell 2-form.

Electromagnetism is an example of a  gauge theory. There are gauge theories, such as Yang–Mills theory, in which the Lie group is not abelian. In that case, one gets relations which are similar to those described here. The analog of the field  in such theories is the curvature form of the connection, which is represented in a gauge by a Lie algebra-valued one-form . The Yang–Mills field  is then defined by

In the abelian case, such as electromagnetism, but this does not hold in general.

Applications in geometric measure theory

Numerous minimality results for complex analytic manifolds are based on the Wirtinger inequality for 2-forms.  A succinct proof may be found in Herbert Federer's classic text Geometric Measure Theory.  The Wirtinger inequality is also a key ingredient in Gromov's inequality for complex projective space in systolic geometry.

See also

 Closed and exact differential forms
 Complex differential form
 Vector-valued differential form
 Equivariant differential form
 Calculus on Manifolds
 Multilinear form
 Polynomial differential form

Notes

References
 
 
 —Translation of Formes différentielles (1967)
 
 
  provides a brief discussion of integration on manifolds from the point of view of measure theory in the last section.
 
  This textbook in multivariate calculus introduces the exterior algebra of differential forms at the college calculus level.
 
 
  standard introductory text.

External links
 
 , a course taught at Cornell University.
 , an undergraduate text.

 
Differential geometry